Eleutherodactylus auriculatoides is a species of frog in the family Eleutherodactylidae endemic to the Cordillera Central in the Dominican Republic. Its natural habitats are montane closed forest. It is an arboreal species often found in bromeliads. Habitat loss caused by agriculture and charcoal production is the main threat to it. Its presence is uncertain in Haiti.

References
 

auriculatoides
Endemic fauna of the Dominican Republic
Amphibians of the Dominican Republic
Taxa named by Gladwyn Kingsley Noble
Amphibians described in 1923
Taxonomy articles created by Polbot